Slavery existed in the United States from since the arrival of the first Africans to English North America in Jamestown in 1619 (still at the time of the Thirteen Colonies), until the passage of the Thirteenth Amendment to the United States Constitution on December 5, 1865, under which it was abolished nationally. The last known survivors who were born into legalized slavery or enslaved prior to the passage of the amendment are listed below. The list also contains the last known survivors in various states which abolished legal slavery prior to 1865. Some birth dates are difficult to verify due to lack of birth documentation of many enslaved individuals.

List of last survivors of American slavery

Discredited

See also
 List of slaves

References

External links
 Last slave ship descendants

Last surviving American slaves
American slaves
Slaves
Slaves
Slavery-related lists